Ilala is an administrative ward in the Iringa Urban district of the Iringa Region of Tanzania. In 2016 the Tanzania National Bureau of Statistics report there were 4,654 people in the ward, from 4,448 in 2012.

Neighborhoods 
The ward has 7 neighborhoods.

 Dabobado
 Embakasi
 Kajificheni
 Lami A
 Lami B
 Mlamke
 Nyumba Tatu

References 

Wards of Iringa Region